Maybe This Christmas Tree is a holiday compilation album released in October 2004 through Nettwerk Records featuring contemporary musicians performing both classic and original Christmas songs.

Reception

Allmusic's MacKenzie Wilson awarded the compilation four out of five stars and called it Nettwerk's "finest yuletide compilation yet".

Track listing
 "Happy Christmas (War Is Over)" (John Lennon, Yoko Ono), performed by The Polyphonic Spree – 4:18 	
 "The Christmas Song" (Sune Rose Wagner), performed by The Raveonettes – 2:15 	
 "Christmas (Baby Please Come Home)" (Jeff Barry, Ellie Greenwich, Phil Spector), performed by Death Cab for Cutie – 3:05 	
 "I Heard the Bells on Christmas Day", performed by Pedro the Lion – 4:40 	
 "Bittersweet Eve" (Brett Detar, Chris Evenson), performed by Belasana – 4:51 	
 "Christmas Time Is Here" (Vince Guaraldi), performed by Ivy – 2:56 	
 "Baby It's Cold Outside" (Frank Loesser), performed by Royal Crown Revue and Vicky Tafoya – 3:25 	
 "Wonderful Christmastime" (Paul McCartney), performed by Tom McRae – 4:10 	
 "Fairytale of New York" (Jem Finer, Shane MacGowan), performed by Pilate – 4:56 	
 "Jingle Bells", performed by Lisa Loeb – 3:21 	
 "Christmas for Cowboys" (Steve Weisberg), performed by Jars of Clay – 2:52 	
 "Do You Hear What I Hear?" (Noël Regney), performed by Copeland – 3:32

Track listing adapted from Allmusic.

Personnel

 Ralph Alfonso – typography
 Jeff Barry – composer
 Dave Bassett – arranger, engineer, mixing, producer
 Belasana – primary artist
 João Carvalho – producer
 Andy Chase – mixing, producer
 Jon Chiccarelli – engineer
 Copeland – primary artist
 Mitch Dane – engineer, mixing
 Mel Davis – violin
 Death Cab for Cutie – primary artist
 Brett Detar – composer, engineer, producer
 Dominique Durand – vocals
 Chris Evenson – composer, engineer, mixing, producer
 Eric Drew Feldman – producer
 Jem Finer – composer
 Brian Friedman – engineer, mixing
 Richard Gottehrer – producer
 James Gray – accordion
 Ellie Greenwich – composer
 Vince Guaraldi – composer
 Ivy – primary artist
 Jars of Clay – primary artist, producer
 Sarah Kishivevsky – violin
 Bryan Laurenson – mixing, producer
 John Lennon – composer
 Jeffrey Lesser – mixing
 Lindi – vocal arrangement
 Lisa Loeb – primary artist, producer
 Frank Loesser – composer
 Zé Luis – conductor, producer, string arrangements
 Shane MacGowan – composer
 Aaron Marsh – producer
 Paul McCartney – composer
 Tom McRae – primary artist, producer
 Yoko Ono – composer
 Pedro the Lion – arranger, primary artist, producer
 Pilate – primary artist
 The Polyphonic Spree – primary artist
 Vance Powell – engineer
 The Raveonettes – primary artist
 Noël Regney – composer
 Royal Crown Revue – primary artist
 Geoff Sanoff – engineer
 Adam Schlesinger – producer
 Monica Seide – compilation producer, producer
 Shag – design, graphic design, layout design
 Phil Spector – composer
 Speekers – producer
 Vicky Tafoya – primary artist
 Louie Teran – mastering
 Laura Usiskin – cello
 Sune Rose Wagner – composer, producer
 Chris Walla – engineer, mixing, producer
 Steve Weisberg – composer
 Emily Yaffe – viola
 Ianthe Zevos – design coordinator

Credits adapted from Allmusic.

References

2004 Christmas albums
2004 compilation albums
Charity albums
Christmas compilation albums
Nettwerk Records compilation albums
Pop rock Christmas albums
Pop rock compilation albums